Prophecy is the fourth studio album by American heavy metal band Soulfly, released in 2004. It is noteworthy for three guest artists – the completely different line-up for the album apart from leader Max Cavalera, the world music influence from a stint that Cavalera spent in Serbia, and explicit spirituality themes on the album. The album has gone on to sell over 275,000 copies.

Lineup change
Cavalera recruited a whole new line-up for the Prophecy album. Joe Nunez was back behind the drum kit having worked on the Primitive album with former Ill Niño lead guitarist Marc Rizzo. There are two bassists playing as members of Soulfly on Prophecy – Megadeth's David Ellefson and Primer 55's Bobby Burns. Cavalera took this decision to have a mixture of old school metal and death metal on the album.

Max Cavalera explained on Roadrunner Records' website that he wanted to use different musicians as part of the group for each album. "This is an approach that I've wanted to do for a while. I never wanted Soulfly to be a band like Metallica, with the same four guys. On every Soulfly album, we've changed the line-up and it will probably continue that way. In order to do that, I had to start from the inside out and bring in people who caught my attention, that I had never played with before, and create this." However, with the exception of Ellefson, Soulfly retained this lineup for four consecutive studio albums, with Burns and Nunez departing following the release of Omen, in 2010.

World music influences
In Sepultura, Cavalera had shown an interest in world music as shown on the 1996 Roots album featuring elements of the music of Brazil's indigenous peoples. This approach continues on the Prophecy album with Cavalera travelling to Serbia to record with traditional musicians. On the track "Moses", an explicit statement of his religious beliefs, he works with Serbian band Eyesburn and includes reggae influences. Other tracks on the album employ instruments from the Middle Ages, sheepskin bagpipes and Serbian Gypsies.

Spirituality influences
On the band's website, Max Cavalera said that he founded the band "with the idea of combined sounds and spiritual beliefs." The Prophecy album contains the clearest statement of his beliefs with "I Believe" containing a spoken part in the middle where Cavalera expresses his faith.

Critical reception

According to CMJ from 3/22/04 pg. 18, "[T]he tracks on Prophecy have worldly textures and a distinct vibe that furthers Soulfly's status as a fluid musical tribe." John Serba of AllMusic praised Cavalera for their most well-done album possibly since his career with Sepultura. He also praised that there are many organic influences, the album was tagged the "Bob Marley of metal." Don Kaye of Blabbermouth says this album is "a strong, if disjointed effort, yet SOULFLY itself sounds more and more like a project searching for new ground, instead of a growing and developing rock act." Vik Bansal of musicOMH noted that the album serves as testaments to legendary metal bands from the 1980s. According to Cavalera, Prophecy is dedicated "to God, the Most High", and is littered with religious art and professions of faith. Adrien Begrand of PopMatters says "Although a bit inconsistent for about half an hour in the album's second half, the magic is indeed back."

In 2005, Prophecy was ranked number 306 in Rock Hard magazine's book of The 500 Greatest Rock & Metal Albums of All Time.

Track listing

Personnel 
Soulfly
Max Cavalera – lead vocals, four-string guitar, sitar, berimbau
Marc Rizzo – lead guitar, flamenco guitar
Bobby Burns – bass on all tracks (except where noted)
Joe Nunez – drums, percussion

Additional musicians
Meia Noite – percussion
Ljubomir Dimitrijević – kaval, gemshorn, zurla, gajde, dvojnice, bagpipes, flutes on "Execution Style", "Born Again Anarchist", "Soulfly IV"
Danny Marianino – additional lead vocals on "Defeat U"
Mark Pringle – backing vocals on "Defeat U"
Asha Rabouin – lead vocals on "Wings", backing vocals on "I Believe"
John Gray – keyboards, samples
David Ellefson – bass on "Prophecy", "Defeat U", "Mars", "I Believe" (outro), "In the Meantime"

Additional personnel
Max Cavalera – production
John Gray – recording, engineering, editing
Terry Date – mixing
Sam Hofstedt – additional engineering
Ted Jensen – mastering
Monte Conner – A&R
Gloria Cavalera – executive production

Charts

References

Soulfly albums
2004 albums
Roadrunner Records albums
Albums produced by Max Cavalera